Arizona is a state in the southwestern region of the United States. The region's second-quarter 2018 gross state product was $344.6 billion, with growth driven by the information and manufacturing sectors. The state ranked #17 on Forbes list of Best States For Business in 2018, noting strong economic and job growth foerecasts. Arizona's economy historically relied on the "five C's": copper, cotton, cattle, citrus, and climate. While Arizona's copper mining is still the nation's primary source of the metal, services and manufacturing are now the drivers of the state's economy.

Notable firms 
This list includes notable companies with primary headquarters located in the state. The industry and sector follow the Industry Classification Benchmark taxonomy. Organizations which have ceased operations are included and noted as defunct.

See also 
 List of corporations in Phoenix
 Copper mining in Arizona
 Silver mining in Arizona

References 

Arizona